Leonard Clark Stockwell  (August 25, 1859 – January 28, 1905) was an American professional baseball player who played outfield, first base, and catcher from 1879 to 1890. He was born in Cordova, Illinois and died in Niles, California.

References

External links

Baseball players from Illinois
Louisville Eclipse players
Cleveland Blues (NL) players
Cleveland Spiders players
19th-century baseball players
1859 births
1905 deaths
Major League Baseball outfielders
Davenport Brown Stockings players
Grand Rapids (minor league baseball) players
Norfolk (minor league baseball) players
Milwaukee Brewers (minor league) players
New Britain (minor league baseball) players
Utica Pent Ups players
Eau Claire Lumbermen players
Savannah (minor league baseball) players
St. Paul Saints (Northwestern League) players
Stockton (minor league baseball) players
San Francisco Haverlys players
Lincoln Rustlers players
Des Moines Prohibitionists players
Oakland Colonels players
Rockford Hustlers players
Galesburg (minor league baseball) players